Borgofranco sul Po is a comune (municipality) in the Province of Mantua in the Italian region Lombardy, located about  southeast of Milan and about  southeast of Mantua.

Borgofranco sul Po borders the following municipalities: Bergantino, Carbonara di Po, Magnacavallo, Melara, Ostiglia, Borgo Mantovano.

References

Cities and towns in Lombardy